Björn Borg was the defending champion but did not compete that year.

Onny Parun won in the final 4–6, 6–4, 6–4, 6–7, 6–4 against Brian Fairlie.

Seeds
Champion seeds are indicated in bold text while text in italics indicates the round in which those seeds were eliminated.

Draw

Final

Top half

Bottom half

References

ATP Auckland Open
1975 in tennis